Anacridium melanorhodon, known as the Sahelian tree locust, is a species of grasshoppers in the subfamily Cyrtacanthacridinae.

Subspecies 
The Orthoptera Species File lists:
 A. melanorhodon arabafrum Dirsh, 1953
 A. melanorhodon melanorhodon (Walker, 1870) (as Acridium melanorhodon Walker) - is the Sahelian tree locust

Gallery

References

External links 
 
 
 Names in Dogon languages, with images from Mali

Cyrtacanthacridinae
Orthoptera of Africa